Klondike is an unincorporated community in Delta County, Texas, United States. It lies in the southwest corner of the county at the junction of Farm to Market Roads 1528 and 2890, 3 miles southwest of Cooper. As of the 2000 Census, its population was estimated at 135.

History
Klondike's documented history began in 1852, when local landowner John Hunt donated a parcel of land for a cemetery for the community, which was then known as Pleasant Grove. By the early 1860s, a school had begun serving the area's pupils, sharing a building with a small Methodist congregation.

Pleasant Grove entered a period of mild prosperity in 1895, when the Texas-Midland Railroad spur to Cooper was completed through the community, and by 1897, the population had risen to 75, and prominent citizen and landowner Joel Jefferson Hunt applied for a postal franchise under the name Klondike, in honor of the Canadian Klondike, site of the gold rush. In 1901, the Klondike Baptist Church of Christ, which had been sharing a building with the Methodist congregation, built their own building, and three years later, Klondike's population exceeded 150, and by 1905, the community's two segregated schools had a combined enrollment of 183 students. Bolstered by the cotton shipping and processing industry, by 1914, Klondike was home to three doctors, several commercial businesses (including a bank), a telegraph station, two large cotton gins, and a population of 400.

The boll weevil blight of the 1920s brought a great degree of adversity to Klondike, however, and the onset of the Great Depression essentially ended the community's prosperity;  by 1933 the population had fallen to 154. When the school building was destroyed by fire in 1945, Klondike schools were consolidated with fellow Delta County community Shiloh's schools to form the West Delta Independent School District, but by 1970, Klondike's school children were attending classes in Cooper. Despite the adversity, the population has remained fairly consistent since the 1960s, and as of the 2000 census, an estimated 135 residents were still living in Klondike.

References

Unincorporated communities in Texas
Unincorporated communities in Delta County, Texas
Dallas–Fort Worth metroplex